The 2007 AMF Futsal Men's World Cup was the 9th edition of the AMF Futsal World Cup. It was held in several cities in the province of Mendoza (Argentina), from August 31 to September 9. It was organized by the Confederación Argentina de Fútbol de Salón (CAFS) and the Asociación Mundial de Futsal (AMF) with the participation of 16 national teams. Paraguay was once again proclaimed as AMF Futsal World Champions when they defeated the host team, Argentina, in the final by a score of 1–0.

The matches were played in Las Heras, Luján de Cuyo, Maipú, Junín, Godoy Cruz and San Rafael.

Teams

Pools round

Final round

Quarter finals

Semifinals

Third place

Final

Final standings

External links
Official website – Mendoza 2007
News on AMF website

AMF Futsal World Cup
AMF
International futsal competitions hosted by Argentina
Futsal